Constantin Dausch (November 30, 1841 in Waldsee, Württemberg - July 12, 1908 in Rome) was a German sculptor.

Dausch was born in Bad Waldsee, and studied in the Munich Academy, and went to Rome on a Württemberg state scholarship in 1869. He remained there until his death in 1908, from 1873 onwards working in the studio that had once belonged to Antonio Canova.

External links
 Biography by King's College London

1841 births
1908 deaths
People from Bad Waldsee
People from the Kingdom of Württemberg
German sculptors
German male sculptors